Fort Point Lighthouse is a lighthouse located on the Mersey River outside the town of Liverpool in the Canadian province of Nova Scotia. First erected in 1832, it served as a navigational aid for local sailors and fishermen until 1954, when it was taken out of operation.

See also
List of lighthouses in Canada

References

External links
Region of Queens Municipality Retrieved 25 February 2017
Fort Point Lighthouse Canada's Historic Places. Retrieved 25 February 2017
 Aids to Navigation Canadian Coast Guard

Lighthouses in Nova Scotia
Lighthouses on the Canadian Register of Historic Places